Arif Mohuiddin Ahmed  is a philosopher at the University of Cambridge, where he became a fellow of Gonville and Caius College in 2015, university reader in philosophy in 2016, and Nicholas Sallnow-Smith College Lecturer in 2019. His interests in philosophy include decision theory and religion, from an atheist and libertarian point of view.

At Cambridge he has been an advocate for tolerance of diverse political views, in reaction to the university administration's cancellation of an invitation to the politically conservative academic Jordan Peterson.

Ahmed was appointed Member of the Order of the British Empire (MBE) in the 2021 Birthday Honours for services to education.

In late 2022, the Minister for Women and Equalities, and Trade Secretary, Kemi Badenoch MP appointed Ahmed as new Commissioner to the Equality and Human Rights Commission (EHRC) Board.

Books
Ahmed is the author of the books Saul Kripke (Continuum Books, 2007), which analyses the philosophy of Saul Kripke, and Evidence, Decision and Causality (Cambridge University Press, 2014), which defends evidential decision theory and critiques causal decision theory.

He is the editor of:
Wittgenstein's Philosophical investigations: A critical guide (2010)
Newcomb's Problem (2018)

References

External links
 Profile at University of Cambridge
 

21st-century atheists
21st-century biographers
21st-century British economists
21st-century English philosophers
21st-century essayists
Action theorists
Analytic philosophers
Atheist philosophers
English atheists
English biographers
English essayists
English libertarians
English logicians
English male non-fiction writers
British people of Arab descent
Epistemologists
Free speech activists
Fellows of Gonville and Caius College, Cambridge
Living people
Philosophers of culture
Philosophers of economics
Philosophers of logic
Philosophers of mind
Philosophers of religion
Philosophers of social science
Philosophy academics
Philosophy writers
Wittgensteinian philosophers
Year of birth missing (living people)
Members of the Order of the British Empire